Woodburn High School (WHS) is a four-year public high school located in Woodburn, Oregon, United States.

Academics

Via funding from the Bill and Melinda Gates Foundation, the WHS campus is divided into four smaller schools and focus on different areas of study:

 Academy of International Studies (AIS)
 Woodburn Academy of Art, Science, & Technology (WAAST)
 Woodburn Arts & Communications Academy (WACA)
 Wellness, Business, and Sports School (WeBSS)

Since July 3, 2001, AIS, WAAST, and WACA have offered International Baccalaureate courses and students can earn a full IB diploma.
WeBSS is the only school on the campus that offers Advanced Placement courses.

Graduation rates

In 2018, 86% of the Academy of International Studies seniors received a high school diploma. Of 49 seniors, seven dropped out.

95% of the Wellness, Business, and Sports seniors received a high school diploma. Of 65 seniors, two dropped out.

92% of the Academy of Arts, Science, and Technology seniors received a high school diploma. Of 83 seniors, six dropped out.

86% of the Arts and Communications Academy seniors received a high school diploma. Of 83 seniors, ten dropped out.

Academic achievements

In 2019 the Woodburn Academy of Arts, Science & Technology was ranked 6th on U.S. News list of best high schools in Oregon.

Athletics
Woodburn High School has a variety of sports teams that compete in the 4A-3 OSAA West Conference throughout the school year.
 The school’s athletic director is Chad Waples  and the athletic secretary is Rocio Avila.

Sports

Fall sports include Football, Cross country,   Volleyball, Soccer and Cheer.

Winter sports include Basketball, Wrestling, Cheer and Dance.

Spring sports include Track, Tennis, Golf, Softball, and Baseball.

Athletic achievements

The WHS boys soccer team have made it to the playoffs 26 years in a row, a state record for the longest stretch of playoff appearances. The first appearance was in 1986.

The WHS boys soccer team won their first 5A state championship in 2010.
WHS boys soccer team continued to win 5A state championships in 2011, 2012, 2016, and 2017. The WHS boys soccer team won their first 4A state championship in 2018. The team then continued to win a 4A state championship in 2019. The WHS girls soccer team won their first 4A state championship in 2019.

WHS has sixteen state championships: seven in wrestling, eight in soccer, and one in baseball.

Fire
There was a four-alarm fire at the school on Friday, May 11, 2012.  The call for the fire came in shortly before 9:30am.  Students were evacuated and no injuries were reported.  Parents were alerted via a reverse 9-1-1 call.

Subject of Book
Several students from Woodburn High School were the subject of the 2010 non-fiction book, The Boys From Little Mexico, by Steve Wilson, which followed the 2005 Woodburn Bulldogs through a season of soccer and examined the personal lives of the players.

Notable alumni
Stacy Allison, author, motivational speaker, first American woman to reach the summit of Mt. Everest in 1988; class of 1976 
 Kat Bjelland, lead singer of the punk rock band Babes in Toyland; class of 1981
 Tom Gorman, professional baseball player
 Kate Nauta, actress and model; class of 2000
 Georgia Hardstark, an American television host and podcast personality, best known for Unique Sweets and My Favorite Murder Podcast

References

Woodburn, Oregon
International Baccalaureate schools in Oregon
High schools in Marion County, Oregon
Public high schools in Oregon